Matthias Stirnemann (born 8 November 1991) is a Swiss cross-country mountain biker.

He finished 6th overall in the 2016 UCI Mountain Bike World Cup.

Major results
2017
 1st  Overall Cape Epic (with Nino Schurter)
2018
 1st  Overall Swiss Epic (with Andri Frischknecht)

References

1991 births
Living people
Swiss male cyclists
Cape Epic winners
Swiss mountain bikers